Ubiquitin carboxyl-terminal hydrolase 44 is an enzyme that in humans is encoded by the USP44 gene.

References

Further reading